Phragmataecia parvipuncta is a species of moth of the family Cossidae. It is found in India, Sri Lanka and Vietnam.

References

Moths described in 1892
Phragmataecia